is a railway station in the town of Ikawa, Akita Prefecture,  Japan, operated by JR East.

Lines
Ikawa-Sakura Station is served by the Ōu Main Line, and is located 323.6 km from the terminus of the line at Fukushima Station.

Station layout
The station consists of two opposed side platform connected to the station building by an underground passageway. The station is staffed. The station building includes a community center, a reading room, and a cafe.

Platforms

History
Ikawa-Sakura Station opened on December 1, 1995.

Passenger statistics
In fiscal 2018, the station was used by an average of 277 passengers daily (boarding passengers only).

Surrounding area
 Ikawa town office
 Shimoikawa post office

See also
List of railway stations in Japan

References

External links

 JR East Station information 

Railway stations in Japan opened in 1995
Railway stations in Akita Prefecture
Ōu Main Line
Ikawa, Akita